Matchi-Manitou is an unorganized territory in the Abitibi-Témiscamingue region of Quebec, Canada. It is one of five unorganized territories in La Vallée-de-l'Or Regional County Municipality.

Until July 6, 1996, Matchi-Manitou was a vast unorganized territory encompassing . On that day, most of it was added to the City of Senneterre and a smaller portion to the City of Val-d'Or. It retained only two small non-contiguous areas, of which its eastern part is a section of land straddling both banks of the Chochocouane River and mostly part of the La Vérendrye Wildlife Reserve.

It is named after Matchi-Manitou Lake, which used to be within its limits, but since 1996 is part of Senneterre and Val-d'Or.

Demographics
Population:
 Population in 2011: 0
 Population in 2006: 0
 Population in 2001: 0
 Population in 1996: 241 (prior to reorganization)
 Population in 1991: 240

References

Unorganized territories in Abitibi-Témiscamingue